Discount Investment Corporation Ltd., or DIC, is a holding company based in Israel. The company is listed on the Tel Aviv Stock Exchange and is a constituent of the TA-125 Index.

DIC also holds stakes in a number of companies, including Elron Electronic Industries, Cellcom Israel, and Israir.

History
Discount Investment Corporation was founded in 1961 as an investment vehicle of the Recanati family, which at the time were owners of the Israel Discount Bank, itself founded by the family in the 1930s after emigrating from Greece during the British Mandate of Palestine. The family business were controlled by umbrella company IDB Holding Corporation (IDB standing for Israel Discount Bank) founded in 1969.

In 2002 the company sold its holdings to a group of investors headed by Nochi Dankner.

In September 2012, Discount Investment Corporation and its parent company IDB Holdings had a "going concern" warning attached to their second-quarter financial reports by the group's auditors, who doubted the company can meet all its debt-repayment obligations in the foreseeable future. Bondholders of the company's debt started the process of taking control over the company. The company was then taken over by Argentinian businessman Eduardo Elsztain.

External links

References

Holding companies of Israel
Holding companies established in 1961
Israeli companies established in 1961
Recanati family